Mansur Beygi (also Romanized as Manşūr Beygī) is a village in Dodangeh Rural District, in the Central District of Behbahan County, Khuzestan Province, Iran. At the 2006 census, its population was 161, in 31 families.

References 

Populated places in Behbahan County